Tell Me Who You Are may refer to:

 Tell Me Who You Are (2009 film), a 2009 Malian drama film
 Tell Me Who You Are (1933 film), a 1933 German comedy film
 "Tell Me Who You Are" (Malene song), the Danish entry in the Eurovision Song Contest 2002
"Kazi Koj Si Ti" ("Tell Me Who You Are"), a song by Tamara Todevska, the Macedonian entry in the Eurovision Song Contest 2007
"Tell Me Who You Are", a song by Jandek from Somebody in the Snow